Baraga Township is a civil township of Baraga County in the U.S. state of Michigan. As of the 2020 census, the township population was 3,478. The village of Baraga is located in the southeast corner of the township.

Communities
Arnheim was a station on the Duluth, South Shore and Atlantic Railway, midway between L'Anse and Houghton. Storekeeper Martin Erikson became the first postmaster on November 13, 1900. The office closed in either 1915 or 1916 and reopened from August 15, 1917, until September 30, 1951. Arnheim was named after Jeremiah Arn (died 1911). Jeremiah Arn was employed to strip the Portage Entry quarries until the over-burden of stone was removed. He settled on a farm at Arnheim and started a quarry which he worked for many years. 
Assinins was founded in 1843 by Catholic missionary Frederic Baraga, who named it for an Assiniboin chief whom Baraga had converted and who remained Baraga's devoted friend. In the 1870s, the settlement was known as the "Catholic Mission". The first post office in the area was named "Fewsville" from 1872, after Gershom B. Few, who operated a distillery, and George W. Few, who became the first postmaster on September 22, 1875. The office closed in 1877. It reopened as "Assinins" on December 6, 1894, with Simon Denomie as the first postmaster and discontinued on May 31, 1914.
 Baraga is a village at the junction of US Highway 41 and M-38 in the east-central portion of the township. The Baraga ZIP code 49908 serves a region in the central part of the township.
Fewsville – see Assinins.
Froberg is an unincorporated community in the township.
Iron Bridge is an unincorporated community in the township.
Kelsey is an unincorporated community in the township.
A land patent was issued to Frank Laffrenire by US President Ulysses S. Grant on May 10, 1875. The settlement was known as "Leffenire" until 1898. Annie La Fernier became the first postmaster on March 26, 1898, with the office named "La Fernier". However Annie had it changed on June 1, 1901, to the name of the large bay on which the village was located. The post office was discontinued on January 16, 1976, and became a CPO of Baraga. It was also a station on the Duluth, South Shore and Atlantic Railway. "Keweenaw" (kewawenon) was a Native American word for portage.
 Pelkie is an unincorporated community in the northeast part of the township. The Pelkie ZIP code 49958 serves areas in the northern and northwestern parts of the township.

Geography

Demographics
As of the 2000 United States Census, there were 3,542 people, 1,178 households, and 777 families in the township. The population density was 19.1 per square mile (7.4/km). There were 1,455 housing units at an average density of 7.8 per square mile (3.0/km). The racial makeup of the township was 67.56% White, 12.11% African American, 14.00% Native American, 0.40% Asian, 0.48% from other races, and 5.45% from two or more races. Hispanic or Latino of any race were 1.19% of the population. 28.3% were of Finnish, 9.6% German and 8.8% French ancestry according to the 2000 census.

There were 1,178 households, out of which 33.6% had children under the age of 18 living with them, 49.6% were married couples living together, 11.8% had a female householder with no husband present, and 34.0% were non-families. 30.0% of all households were made up of individuals, and 13.3% had someone living alone who was 65 years of age or older. The average household size was 2.49 and the average family size was 3.10.

The township population contained 23.6% under the age of 18, 8.7% from 18 to 24, 34.4% from 25 to 44, 21.3% from 45 to 64, and 11.9% who were 65 years of age or older. The median age was 35 years. For every 100 females, there were 136.6 males. For every 100 females age 18 and over, there were 147.9 males.

The median income for a household in the township was $32,639, and the median income for a family was $41,750. Males had a median income of $32,373 versus $23,516 for females. The per capita income for the township was $14,550. About 8.2% of families and 11.8% of the population were below the poverty line, including 15.0% of those under age 18 and 11.8% of those age 65 or over.

References

External links
Baraga Township official website

Townships in Baraga County, Michigan
Townships in Michigan
Michigan populated places on Lake Superior